Thushara or Thusara (Sinhala: තුෂාරා) is a Sinhalese name that may refer to the following notable people:
Given name
Thushara Fernando (born 1982), Sri Lankan cricketer
Thushara Indunil, Sri Lankan politician 
Thusara Kodikara (born 1969), Malaysian cricketer
Thushara Madushanka (born 1993), Sri Lankan cricketer
Thushara Pillai (born 1980), Indian astrophysicist
Thushara Weerasuriya (born 1967), Sri Lankan cricketer

Surname
Nuwan Thushara (born 1994), Sri Lankan cricketer
Thilan Thushara (born 1981), Sri Lankan cricketer

See also
Thushara (1973 film), a Sri Lankan romantic film
Thushara (2009 film), a Sri Lankan romantic film

Sinhalese masculine given names
Sinhalese surnames